James Grady (born 14 March 1971 in Paisley) is a Scottish former footballer who spent the majority of his career in the top two divisions in Scottish football. He played as a striker, and became player/manager for Greenock Morton in the First Division between 2009 and 2010.

Grady started in the junior ranks with Barrhead side Arthurlie, before turning senior with Clydebank. After three seasons at Kilbowie, Grady got a move to Dundee, where stayed for another three seasons. Another spell of three seasons was spent at Ayr United, before a season at Partick Thistle.

He then played at Tannadice Park with Dundee United for a season before spending three years winning the First Division title with the ill-fated Gretna. A short spell at Hamilton Academical ended with a loan spell at Morton, which was turned permanent, before he was made the player-manager after Davie Irons was removed from his post.

Playing career
Grady played in Scotland for his entire career.

After a spell in junior football with Arthurlie, he moved to former senior outfit Clydebank, who now play junior before spending three seasons with Dundee. A further three years were spent with Ayr United, before a prolific season in the SPL with Partick Thistle saw him finish the top Scottish scorer with 15 goals.

An unproductive season with Dundee United followed, in which he scored just twice, but Grady rediscovered his scoring touch in 2005 with Gretna. On 28 April 2007, he scored an injury-time winner against Ross County to secure Gretna's promotion to the SPL as First Division champions.

He joined Hamilton Academical on 31 January 2008. Grady scored his first goal for the Accies against Queen of the South on 1 March. His only other goal for Accies was against Clyde in a 3–1 win in the Scottish League Cup.

Grady joined Greenock Morton on an emergency loan (up to 93 days) on 17 October 2008.

Grady scored on his debut for Morton, in a 1–0 home victory over Clyde on 18 October 2008, to give the Cappielow club their first league victory since beating Partick Thistle on the last day of the previous season. This goal was Grady's 100th league goal of his career.

Grady was released by Hamilton on 2 January 2009, and signed a permanent deal until the end of the season at Morton.

The Daily Record stated that Grady was offered a further contract until January 2010, via its Soccer Shorts section.

Coaching career 
After the sacking of Davie Irons, Grady was made caretaker manager of Greenock Morton alongside Allan McManus. They were appointed permanently (this time with McManus as his assistant) on Halloween 2009. He left Morton on 9 May 2010, after eight months in charge of the club.

As of 2018, Grady was the dedicated coach for the Scottish Football Association's Performance Schools project based at Grange Academy in Kilmarnock. He became coach of the Scotland under-16 team in February 2022.

Career statistics

Honours

Dundee
 Scottish First Division: 1
 1997–98

Ayr United
 Scottish League Cup Runner-up: 1
 2001–02

Dundee United
 Scottish Cup Runner-up: 1
 2004–05

Gretna
 Scottish First Division: 1
 2006–07
 Scottish Second Division: 1
 2005–06
 Scottish Cup Runner-up: 1
 2005–06

Hamilton Academical
 Scottish First Division: 1
 2007–08

See also 
2004–05 Dundee United F.C. season
2008–09 Greenock Morton F.C. season | 09–10

References

External links
 

1971 births
Living people
Footballers from Paisley, Renfrewshire
Clydebank F.C. (1965) players
Dundee F.C. players
Ayr United F.C. players
Dundee United F.C. players
Partick Thistle F.C. players
Gretna F.C. players
Hamilton Academical F.C. players
Greenock Morton F.C. players
Scottish Premier League players
Scottish Football League players
Scottish footballers
Association football forwards
Greenock Morton F.C. non-playing staff
Greenock Morton F.C. managers
Scottish Junior Football Association players
Scottish football managers
Arthurlie F.C. players
Scottish Football League managers
Scottish men's futsal players